Seahaven may refer to:

 Seahaven, Washington, U.S.
 Seahaven, East Sussex, UK
 Seahaven FM, a community radio station in Seahaven, East Sussex
 Seahaven, the fictional town in the 1998 film The Truman Show
 Seahaven (band), an alternative rock band from the United States